The Catholic bishops of Ukraine divide into 2 different conferences. There is the Conference of Roman Catholic Bishops in Ukraine (Ukrainian: Конференція Римо-Католицьких Єпископів України, Latin: Conferentia episcoporum Ucrainae) and there is the Synod of Bishops of Ukrainian Catholic Church (Byzantine rite) (Latin: Synod Ecclesiae Ucrainae Catholic (bycantini)). 

Both conferences are a member of the Council of European Bishops' Conferences.

The Synod

President of the Ukrainian Catholic Church is His Beatitude Sviatoslav Shevchuk, Archbishop and Metropolitan of Kiev in Ukraine.

The Conference of Roman Catholic bishops in Ukraine

Bureau

President: Mieczyslaw Mokrzycki, Archbishop of Lviv

Vice President and Secretary of the Commission for Liturgy and sacred art: Markijan Trofimiak, Bishop of Lutsk

Secretaries and commissions
 Commission for Family Marian Buczek, coadjutor bishop of Lviv
 Commission for religious women's orders, Leon Maly, Auxiliary Bishop of Lviv
 Commission for priestly vocation, Jan Purwinski, Emeritus Bishop of Kyiv and Zhytomyr
 Commission for charitable and philanthropic support, Stanislav Shyrokoradiuk, OFM, Auxiliary Bishop of Kyiv and Zhytomyr
 Commission for Public Relations and Mass Media, Vitaliy Skomarovskyi, Auxiliary Bishop of Kyiv and Zhytomyr
 Commission for Catechesis, Leon Dubrawski, OFM, Bishop of Kamjanets-Podilsky
 Commission for Religious Order of men, Stanislaw Padewski, OFM Cap, Emeritus Bishop of Kharkiv and Zaporizhia
 Commission on Environment and Tourism, Antal Majnek, OFM, Bishop of Mukacheve
 Commission for the faith, Bronislaw Bernacki, Bishop of Odessa and Simferopol

References

External links
 http://www.rkc.lviv.ua/index.php
 http://www.gcatholic.org/dioceses/conference/214.htm
 http://ecclesia-catholica.org.ua/

Ukraine
Catholic Church in Ukraine